In quantum field theory and statistical mechanics, loop integrals are the integrals which appear when evaluating the Feynman diagrams with one or more loops by integrating over the internal momenta. These integrals are used to determine counterterms, which in turn allow evaluation of the beta function, which encodes the dependence of coupling  for an interaction on an energy scale .

One-loop integral

Generic formula
A generic one-loop integral, for example those appearing in one-loop renormalization of QED or QCD may be written as a linear combination of terms in the form

This expression uses Euclidean signature. In Lorentzian signature the denominator would instead be a product of expressions of the form .

Using Feynman parametrization, this can be rewritten as a linear combination of integrals of the form

This integral is also integrated over the domain of the Feynman parameters. The integral is an isotropic tensor and so can be written as an isotropic tensor without  dependence (but possibly dependent on the dimension ), multiplied by the integral

Note that if  were odd, then the integral vanishes, so we can define .

Regularizing the integral

Cutoff regularization 
In Wilsonian renormalization, the integral is made finite by specifying a cutoff scale . The integral to be evaluated is then

where  is shorthand for integration over the domain .

Dimensional regularization
The integral without a momentum cutoff may be evaluated as

where  is the Beta function.

For example in scalar  theory in 4 dimensions, the loop integral in the calculation of one-loop renormalization of the interaction vertex has .

To do this, it is necessary to use the Laurent expansion of the Gamma function,

where  is the Euler–Mascheroni constant. In practice the loop integral generally diverges as 

For full evaluation of the Feynman diagram, there may be algebraic factors which must be evaluated. For example in QED, the tensor indices of the integral may be contracted with Gamma matrices, and identities involving these are needed to evaluate the integral. In QCD, there may be additional Lie algebra factors, such as the quadratic Casimir of the adjoint representation as well as of any representations that matter (scalar or spinor fields) in the theory transform under.

Examples

Scalar field theory

φ4 theory 

Where . The domain is purposefully left ambiguous, as it varies depending on regularisation scheme. 

The Euclidean signature propagator in momentum space is 

The one-loop contribution to the two-point correlator  (or rather, to the momentum space two-point correlator or Fourier transform of the two-point correlator) comes from a single Feynman diagram and is

This is an example of a loop integral.

This is typical of the puzzle of divergences which plagued quantum field theory historically. To obtain finite results, we choose a regularization scheme. For illustration, we give two schemes.

Cutoff regularization: fix . The regularized loop integral is the integral over the domain  and it is typical to denote this integral by

This integral is finite and in this case can be evaluated.

By the computation above, we showed that the integral can be written in terms of expressions which have a well-defined analytic continuation from integers  to functions on : specifically the gamma function has an analytic continuation and taking powers, is an operation which can be analytically continued.

References

Quantum field theory
Statistical mechanics
Renormalization group